Shrewsbury, New Jersey is in eastern Monmouth County. 

Shrewsbury, New Jersey may also refer to:

Shrewsbury Township, New Jersey, in eastern Monmouth County
Shrewsbury, Upper Freehold, New Jersey in southwestern Monmouth County